Nansindlela School is a public school in the Boekenhouthoekarea, near the town of Kwaggafontein, Mpumalanga Province, South Africa.

Founded in 1980, the school has 450 learners from Grade 10 to grade 12 (matric), with a teaching staff of eighteen. The school offers English-medium instruction to the multilingual local community, which is predominantly Ndebele speaking people.

The name Nansindlela means "This is the way" in Isizulu and can be interpreted to Nasindlela in IsiNdebele.

The school has won a number of awards for its consistent academic performance and involvement in sports and other extra curricular activities.

External links
Nansindlela School home page

Schools in KwaZulu-Natal
Educational institutions established in 1993
1993 establishments in South Africa